, Op. 30 (Thus Spoke Zarathustra or Thus Spake Zarathustra) is a tone poem by Richard Strauss, composed in 1896 and inspired by Friedrich Nietzsche's philosophical 1883–1885 novel Thus Spoke Zarathustra. The composer conducted its first performance on 27 November 1896 in Frankfurt. A typical performance lasts half an hour.

The initial fanfare – titled "Sunrise" in the composer's programme notes – became well known after its use in Stanley Kubrick's 1968 film 2001: A Space Odyssey.

Instrumentation
The work is orchestrated for piccolo, 3 flutes (3rd doubling piccolo), 3 oboes, English horn, clarinet in E-flat, 2 clarinets in B-flat, bass clarinet in B-flat, 3 bassoons, contrabassoon, 6 horns in F and E, 4 trumpets in C and E, 3 trombones, 2 tubas, timpani, bass drum, cymbals, triangle, glockenspiel, bell on low E, organ, and strings: 2 harps, violins I, II (16 each), violas (12), cellos (12), and double basses (8) (with low B string).

Structure

The piece is divided into nine sections played with only three definite pauses. Strauss named the sections after selected chapters of Friedrich Nietzsche's novel Thus Spoke Zarathustra:
"" (Sunrise)
"" (Of the Backworldsmen)
"" (Of the Great Longing)
"" (Of Joys and Passions)
"" (The Song of the Grave)
"" (Of Science and Learning)
"" (The Convalescent)
"" (The Dance Song)
"" (Song of the Night Wanderer)

These selected chapters from Nietzsche's novel highlight major moments of the character Zarathustra's philosophical journey in the novel. The general storylines and ideas in these chapters were the inspiration used to build the tone poem's structure.

The piece starts with a sustained double low C on the double basses, contrabassoon and church organ. This transforms into the brass fanfare of the Introduction and introduces the "dawn" motif (from "Zarathustra's Prologue", the text of which is included in the printed score) that is common throughout the work; the motif includes three notes, in intervals of a fifth and octave, as C–G–C (known also as the Nature-motif). On its first appearance, the motif is a part of the first five notes of the natural overtone series: octave, octave and fifth, two octaves, two octaves and major third (played as part of a C major chord with the third doubled). The major third is immediately changed to a minor third, which is the first note played in the work (E flat) that is not part of the overtone series.

"Of the Backworldsmen" begins with cellos, double-basses and organ pedal before changing into a lyrical passage for the entire section.

"Of the Great Longing" introduces motifs that are more chromatic in nature.

"Of Joys and Passions", in C minor, marks the first subject theme of the work's allegro (exposition) proper. 

The strings prevail in "The Song of the Grave", in which some would say the second subject theme, in B minor, starts in this section.

The following portion of the piece can be analyzed as a large development section. "Of Science and Learning" features an unusual fugue beginning at measure 201 in the double-basses and cellos, which consists of all twelve notes of the chromatic scale. Measure 223 contains one of the very few sections in the orchestral literature where the basses must play a contra B (the lowest B on a piano), which is only possible on a 5-string bass or (less frequently) on a 4-string bass with a low-B extension.

The development continues in "The Convalescent". By the end of this section, there is a prolonged retransition over the dominant of C major. 

Back in C major, "The Dance Song" marks the recapitulation. It features a very prominent violin solo throughout the section. Later in this section, elements from "The Song of the Grave" (the second subject theme) are heard in the work's original key.

"Song of the Night Wanderer" marks the coda of the tone poem. It begins with 12 strikes of midnight. The end of the "Song of the Night Wanderer" leaves the piece half-resolved, with high flutes, piccolos and violins playing a B major chord, while the lower strings pluck a C.

One of the major compositional themes of the piece is the contrast between the keys of B major, representing humanity, and C major, representing the universe. Because B and C are adjacent notes, these keys are tonally dissimilar: B major uses five sharps, while C major has none.

World riddle theme
There are two opinions about the world riddle theme. One is that the fifth/octave intervals (C–G–C) constitute the World riddle motif. The other is that the two conflicting keys in the final section represent the World riddle (C–G–C B–F–B8va), with the unresolved harmonic progression being an unfinished or unsolved riddle: the melody does not conclude with a well-defined tonic note as being either C or B, hence it is unfinished. The ending of the composition has been described:

Neither C major nor B major is established as the tonic at the end of the composition.

Recordings
The first recording was made in 1935 with Serge Koussevitzky and the Boston Symphony Orchestra. In 1944, Strauss conducted the Vienna Philharmonic in an experimental high fidelity recording of the piece, made on a German Magnetophon tape recorder. This was later released on LP by Vanguard Records and on CD by various labels. Strauss's friend and colleague, Fritz Reiner, made the first stereophonic recording of the music with the Chicago Symphony Orchestra in March 1954 for RCA Victor. In 2012, this recording was added to the Library of Congress's National Recording Registry 2011 list of "culturally, historically, or aesthetically important" American sound recordings. Thus Spake Zarathustra by the Philharmonia Orchestra conducted by Lorin Maazel reached No. 33 in the UK chart in 1969. The recording of the opening fanfare used for the film 2001: A Space Odyssey was performed by the Vienna Philharmonic and conducted by Herbert von Karajan.

In popular culture
Due to its use in 2001: A Space Odyssey, the opening theme of the tone poem became well-known, and was often used as a portent of a significant event to come or regularly used for space-related scenes:

 The theme became a regular as an intro to singer Elvis Presley’s concerts.
 The BBC used the theme in its television coverage of the Apollo space missions.
 Brazilian musician Eumir Deodato's funk-influenced arrangement of the opening fanfare Sunrise theme, titled "Also Sprach Zarathustra (2001)", reached No. 2 on the Billboard Hot 100 U.S. popular music sales charts in 1973, and No. 7 on the UK Singles Chart. Deodato's version won the 1974 Grammy Award for Best Pop Instrumental Performance and was featured in the 1979 film Being There starring Peter Sellers, as his character leaves home for the very first time, as well as Wonderstruck (2017).
 Retired professional wrestler and pop culture personality Ric Flair used several versions of the opening fanfare as his entrance theme for the majority of his in-ring career.
 The sequel to 2001, 1984's 2010: The Year We Make Contact (itself an adaptation of the book's 1982 sequel, 2010: Odyssey Two) also used the opening fanfare in its opening and closing credits. For the closing credits, it begins with the film's final scene, a scanning shot of Europa revealing a Monolith on its surface.
 The American band Phish has performed this theme 249 times since its live debut July 16, 1993, at The Mann Center for the Performing Arts in Philadelphia, including 14 times at the New York City arena Madison Square Garden.
 WALL-E used the theme during the climax when McCrea defeats AUTO.
 Ray Conniff recorded a version entitled Bah Bah Conniff Sprach (Zarathustra) for his 1973 album You Are the Sunshine of My Life. This version was used in a 2022 TV commercial for Salesforce.

References

External links

 
 , performed by University of Chicago Symphony Orchestra, conducted by Barbara Schubert
 Also sprach Zarathustra score on Musopen
 "Also  Zarathustra: Decoding Strauss' Tone Poem" by Marin Alsop on NPR (January 14, 2012)

1896 compositions
Tone poems by Richard Strauss
Music for orchestra and organ
Adaptations of works by Friedrich Nietzsche
Thus Spoke Zarathustra
United States National Recording Registry recordings